Amor Del Bueno is a 2004 telenovela produced by Venevisión and Iguana Productions. Venezuelan actors Coraima Torres and Ricardo Álamo star as the main protagonists.

Plot
Monica is a beautiful woman and home-maker married to Javier, a cruel and arrogant man who is cheating on her with her best friend Carolina, an ambitious model who sees Javier as her ticket to achieving financial stability. On the other hand, Bernando is a distinguished journalist in the country who dedicates most of his time in his work and doesn't have time for love, until he meets Monica when they are unfortunately kidnapped by men who don't want Bernardo to publish a story involving powerful people in the country and expose their schemes.

Cast
 Coraima Torres as Mónica Lezama
 Ricardo Álamo as Bernardo Valdez
 Karl Hoffman as Javier Lezama (villain)
 Denise Novell as Micaela
 Ana Karina Casanova as Sandra del Valle
 Ricardo Bianchi as Eleazar Romero
 Annabel Rivero as Carolina Moreau (villain)
 Juan Carlos Baena as Leonardo
 Everson Ruiz as Robert
 Maykell Barrientos
 Rodolfo Drago
 Isabel Ferrer
 Chony Fuentes
 William Goite
 Susy Herrera
 Trino Jimenez
 Carmen Landaeta
 Mildred Lozada
 Manuel Martinez
 Alejandro Mata as Emiliano Valdez
 Andreína Mazzeo
 Nicolas Montero as Gustavo León
 Juan Manuel Montesinos
 Elizabeth Morales
 Denise Novel as Micaela

References

External links

Amor del Bueno at foro.telenovela-world.com

2004 telenovelas
Venevisión telenovelas
2004 Venezuelan television series debuts
2004 Venezuelan television series endings
Venezuelan telenovelas
Spanish-language telenovelas
Television shows set in Venezuela